CKC455, branded on-air as CFRE, is a radio station broadcasting at 91.9 FM in Mississauga, Ontario, Canada. Established in 1970, it is the campus radio station of the University of Toronto Mississauga (UTM). The station's initials are derived from Canada's First Radio Erindale (originally Canada Free Radio Erindale) and refer to Erindale College, the original name of UTM.

See also
 List of campus radio stations in Canada

References

External links

Campus radio stations in Canada
Mass media in Mississauga
Radio stations in the Regional Municipality of Peel
University of Toronto
Radio stations established in 1970
1970 establishments in Ontario